Sattler Airfield is an abandoned airfield in the Northern Territory of Australia that was constructed  to the south of Darwin during World War II in what is now the locality of Bees Creek. It was named after Flight Lieutenant Geoffery Sattler, the commander of a Lockheed Hudson A16-7, who died on 12 January 1942 at Keema Bay, North Celebes with the rest of his crew. On 2 April 1942, the then new Sattler RAAF airfield was bombed by the Japanese Imperial Forces. There was minimal damage. There were no Allied planes at the base as it was still under construction.

See also
 List of airports in the Northern Territory

References

Former Royal Australian Air Force bases
World War II airfields in Australia
Defunct airports in the Northern Territory